This is a list of notable Romani Americans.

To be included in this list, the person must have a Wikipedia article showing they are Romani American or must have references showing they are Romani American and are notable.

List
Elek Bacsik - Hungarian-American jazz guitarist and violinist
Gratiela Brancusi - Romanian-born American actress
Cher - singer
Bill Clinton - former president
Michael Costello - fashion designer who made dresses for various celebrities
Billy Drago - actor 
Karen Finley - performance artist, musician and poet
Ava Gardner - actress
Caren Gussoff - author
Ian Hancock - University of Texas linguist, scholar, and activist
Rita Hayworth - actress
Amber L. Hollibaugh - writer, film-maker and political activist
Johns family - subjects of the National Geographic Channel reality television series "American Gypsies"
Priscilla Kelly - professional wrestler
Janet Lee - psychic who sued private investigator Bob Nygaard over alleged anti-Romani bias
Oksana Marafioti - author of Armenian and Romani descent
Gina Marks - psychic and writer
Jimmy Marks - victim of discrimination
Rose Marks - psychic
Jerry Mason - rock musician
Kelly Mitchell
 Paul Miller, better known by his online alias GypsyCrusader, far-right political commentator, streamer, white supremacist, former Muay Thai fighter and convicted felon
 Hillary Monahan - author
 Elvis Presley - singer
 Sani Rifati - Kosovar-American human rights activist and the President of Voice of Roma
Levi and Matilda Stanley - 19th century immigrant Romanichal elders
Nettie Stanley - Matriarch of the family starring in the TLC reality television series "Gypsy Sisters"
 Tracey Ullman - actress

See also
Romani people
List of Romani people

References

Lists of American people by ethnic or national origin

Romani